Heartbreak Hotel is a 1988 American comedy film written and directed by Chris Columbus, and stars David Keith and Tuesday Weld. Set in 1972, the story deals with one of the many "legends" involving Elvis Presley (Keith) about his fictional kidnapping, and his subsequent redemption from decadence.

The film was shot on location in Austin, Texas, at Green Pastures the former residence of John Henry Faulk.

Plot
The film opens in 1972 with a single mother and her two children (a teenage son and nine-year-old daughter) running a boarding house. The mother is hurt in a car accident and hospitalized. As a birthday present, her son and his band drive her Pink Cadillac to Cleveland, Ohio, to kidnap her favorite singer, Elvis Presley. He gets the owner of a local pizzeria, who looks eerily like Elvis' mother, to pose as his mother's ghost as a distraction, and then drugs Elvis with chloroform. Elvis awakens in the boarding house. He and the boy do not get along at first. The boy disrespects Elvis, accusing him of selling out to Vegas. However, the boy and Elvis get to know each other, and they became friends. Elvis closes the film playing "Heartbreak Hotel" with the boy's band at the high school talent show.

Cast
David Keith as Elvis Presley
Tuesday Weld as Marie Wolfe
Charlie Schlatter as Johnny Wolfe
Angela Goethals as Pam Wolfe
Jacque Lynn Colton as Rosie Pantangellio
Chris Mulkey as Steve Ayres
Karen Landry as Irene
Tudor Sherrard as Paul Quinine
Paul J. Harkins as Brian Gasternick (as Paul Harkins)
Noel Derecki as Tony Vandelo
Dana Barron as Beth Devereux
T. Graham Brown as Jerry Schilling
Dennis Letts as Alan Fortas
Stephen Lee Davis as George Klein
Blue Deckert as Jones
Michael Costello as Doctor Charles Devereux
John L. Martin as Sheriff Abrams
John Hawkes as M.C.
Jerry Haynes as Mr. Hansen
Al Dvorin as Self
Ruth Sadlier as Aunt Anne
Monica Devereux as Monica
Hal Ketchum as Steve's Friend
Debra Luijtjes as Cheryl
Diane Robin as Donna

Reception
The film received mixed-to-negative reviews. It currently holds a 38% rating on Rotten Tomatoes based on 13 reviews.

Janet Maslin of The New York Times stated that "Mr. Columbus, who previously directed Adventures in Baby-Sitting and whose writing credits include Gremlins and The Goonies, sets up this idea well but has no idea where to stop. He pushes the film's slender premise much too far, trying to work miraculous feats of self-improvement upon Johnny, his mother, Marie, and even Elvis himself."

The Washington Post'''s Rita Kempley wrote, "With such fruity writing, what do overacting and miscasting (Jay Leno would have been perfect) matter? Playing Elvis is like playing a Kennedy, nearly impossible. And Keith, as we know, had mighty big pants to fill. Face it. The King has left the building, gone to that Caesars Palace in the sky. Columbus, say goodbye."

A one-star review came from Roger Ebert who wrote, "Here it is, the goofiest movie of the year, a movie so bad in so many different and endearing ways that I’m damned if I don’t feel genuine affection for it. We all know it’s bad manners to talk during a movie, but every once in a while a film comes along that positively requires the audience to shout helpful suggestions and lewd one-liners at the screen. 'Heartbreak Hotel' is such a movie. All it needs to be perfect is a parallel soundtrack."

It was also a box office failure, opening with a disappointing $2,063,546 from 1,338 screens, finishing in second place behind Gorillas in the Mist'', despite opening on more than double the number of screens. It went on to gross $5.5 million in the United States and Canada.

Music
Most of the songs contained in the film are actual Elvis Presley recordings despite the film being fictional, with David Keith and Charlie Schlatter performing the title track in the style of the 1968 television special recording.

References

External links

 
 

1988 films
1988 comedy films
American comedy films
Films about Elvis Presley
Films directed by Chris Columbus
Films produced by Debra Hill
Films produced by Lynda Obst
Films scored by Georges Delerue
Films set in 1972
Films shot in Austin, Texas
Films with screenplays by Chris Columbus
Touchstone Pictures films
1980s English-language films
1980s American films